Athribis, also known to the ancient Greeks as Triphieion or Tripheion, and to the ancient Egyptians as Hut-Repyt, was an ancient city of Egypt, in the Panopolite nome. The modern villages of Wannina and Nag' Hamad in the Sohag Governorate are situated nearby.

Overview

The city is the site of a temple built for the goddess Repyt (Triphis) by Ptolemy XV Caesarion and subsequent Roman Emperors. South of this temple was an earlier temple of Ptolemy IX Soter II. One of the tombs nearby, belonging to the brothers Ibpemeny "the younger" and Pemehyt of the late 2nd  century BC, has two zodiacs on its ceiling.

In 2021, archaeologists discovered 13,000 ostraca in Demotic (Egyptian), Hieratic, Coptic, Greek and Arabic with financial transactions.

See also
 Athribis, for the ancient city called Athribis in Lower Egypt.
 List of ancient Egyptian towns and cities
 Athribis Project

References

Richard Talbert, Barrington Atlas of the Greek and Roman World,, p. 77.

Ancient Greek archaeological sites in Egypt
Roman sites in Egypt
Populated places in Sohag Governorate
Former populated places in Egypt